Freakish is the second studio album by English rock band Joe Gideon & The Shark. It was released in January 2013 under Bronzerat Records.

Track list

References

External links
Freakish by Joe Gideon & The Shark at iTunes.com
Freakish at Bronzerat Records

2013 albums
Joe Gideon & the Shark albums